The Musée Jenisch is a museum of fine arts and prints at Vevey in Vaud in Switzerland. It was set up on 10 March 1897, thanks to a legacy of 200,000 francs from Fanny Henriette Jenisch (1801–1881), wife of Martin Johann Jenisch (de), a senator of Hamburg. It was designed in the neo-classical style by the architect Louis Maillard and  Robert Convert.

Art museums and galleries in Switzerland
Vevey
Cultural property of national significance in the canton of Vaud
Art museums established in 1897
1897 establishments in Switzerland
Museums in the canton of Vaud